The Judds Reunion Live is the second live album by American country duo The Judds. It was released on May 9, 2000, in conjunction with Curb Records and Mercury Records. It was produced by Larry Strickland and contained a total of 23 tracks. Reunion Live was the duo's second live effort issued in their career and their first album as a duo in almost ten years.

Background and content
The Judds were among country music's most successful recording artists during the 1980s, having 14 number one singles on the country chart. In 1991, the duo parted ways after Naomi Judd was diagnosed with Hepatitis C. Instead, Wynonna Judd embarked on a successful solo career as Naomi recovered. By the late 1990s, Naomi's disease went into remission and the mother-daughter duo briefly re-united. Together, the duo recorded their first album since their departure at a concert held in Phoenix, Arizona on December 31, 1999.

The Judds Reunion Live was produced by Larry Strickland, a musician and the husband of Naomi Judd. It was Strickland's first time producing an album by the duo. The album comprised 23 tracks, which were all recorded live at the December 31 concert. Eight of the album's tracks were hits performed solely by Wynonna Judd.  "I Saw the Light," "She Is His Only Need" and "Rock Bottom" are some of the Wynonna songs featured. The remaining tracks were performed by The Judds. The album featured most of their biggest hits, such as "Mama He's Crazy," "Why Not Me" and "Rockin' with the Rhythm of the Rain."

Release and reception

The Judds Reunion Live was released on May 9, 2000, on two labels: Curb Records and Mercury Records. It was the second live record in their career. The duo's first live effort was issued in 1995 and contained material first recorded in the 1980s. The album was issued on two compact discs. The first disc contained 12 tracks while the second contained 11. Reunion Live became the duo's first charting album of new material since 1991. It peaked at number 107 on the Billboard 200 albums chart in May 2000 after spending 2 weeks there. It spent 15 weeks on the Billboard Top Country Albums chart before reaching number 16 around the same time. In Canada, the album also peaked at number 16 on their country albums survey. Reunion Live was only given 2.5 out of 5 stars from Allmusic after in their review of the album. However, reviewers did praise several aspects of it. For example, writers noted that the album offered "a generous helping of songs". They also commented on the duo's stage presence, calling The Judds to have "old fashioned showmanship."

Track listing

Disc one

Disc two

Personnel
All credits are adapted from the liner notes of The Judds Reunion Live and Allmusic.

Musical personnel

 Robert Bailey, Jr. – background vocals
 Bruce Bouton – steel guitar
 Kim Fleming – background vocals
 Vicki Hampton – background vocals
 Kirk "Jelly Roll" Johnson – harmonica
 Mark T. Jordan – keyboards
 Ashley Judd – speaker
 Naomi Judd – harmony vocals
 Wynonna Judd – lead vocals
 Fats Kaplin – fiddle, harmonica, steel guitar
 Stephen Mackey – bass
 Rob McNelley – guitar
 Steve Potts – drums
 Harry Sharpe – guitar, keyboards

Technical personnel
 Brett Blanden – production coordination
 Tom Brooks – engineering
 Ed Cherney – mixing
 Ricky Cobble – digital editing
 John Cooper – engineer
 Richard Hanson – engineer
 Mark T. Jordan – music direction
 Julian King – digital editing, engineering, overdubs
 Danny Purcell – percussion
 Larry Strickland – producer

Chart performance

Release history

References

2000 live albums
Curb Records albums
The Judds albums
Mercury Records albums